Cannon Street, is a Lower City collector road in Hamilton, Ontario, Canada. It starts off at Queen Street North as a one-way street (Westbound) up to Sherman Avenue North where it then switches over to a two-way street the rest of the way Eastward and ends just past Kenilworth Avenue North on Barons Avenue and merges with Britannia Avenue, a street that runs parallel with Cannon Street from Ottawa Street North to Barons Avenue.

History

Cannon Street was originally called Henry Street. The section between Bay and James Streets was called Miles Street. The origins of the Cannon street name remains a mystery for local historians. Cannon Street today at Brian Timmis/ former Ivor Wynne Stadium/ Tim Horton's Field location is also known as Bernie Faloney Way which is named after the quarterback who played for the local CFL team, Hamilton Ti-Cats, between the years of 1957-64.

On 24 May 1909 a Coney Island-type amusement park was opened in Hamilton. It was known as Maple Leaf Park and was bounded by Barton Street (north), Ottawa Street (east), Cannon Street (south), Rosslyn Avenue (west). It failed to attract enough visitors to keep the gates open and only lasted a year. Investors of the Park sold the land to local real estate speculators for $25,000 interested in the property because the land itself was a valuable commodity in the booming East Hamilton market.

Landmarks

Note: Listing of Landmarks from West to East.
Hess Street Elementary School
Railway Street
Sir John A. Macdonald Secondary School
Tan Thanh Supermarket Inc. (Vietnamese)
T & H Auto Electric Ltd., building
Jamesville, which is shared by the Italian & Portuguese communities of Hamilton
Mixed Media, (building)
site of the old Tivoli Theatre
Auto Part Source- (discount auto parts centre)
Active Green + Ross: Complete Tire & Auto Centre
Firth Brothers Ltd. (5-storey factory building)
Giant Tiger (All-Canadian family discount store)
McLaren Park
United Trophy Mfg. (since 1926)
Good Shepherd Centre
134 Mary Street Building (Cannon Knitting Mills Limited)
Chevrolet City, (car dealership)
Beasley Park
Beasley Park Community Centre
Barton Auto Parts
Paper Fibres Inc., (company)
Wellington Tavern
Canada Post Corporation: Hamilton letter carrier depot 1
Barton Auto Parts
St. Brigids Elementary School
Hamilton Cab 777-7777 (headquarters)
Wentworth Baptist Church
Hamilton Stirton TS Electrical complex
Brian Timmis Stadium, 
Ivor Wynne Stadium (right behind Brian Timmis Stadium)
Scott Park Secondary School
Scott Park Arena
Canadian Pacific railway line
Holy Name of Jesus Elementary School
Gospel Hall, (church)
Ottawa Street Shopping District - "Textile District"
Laidlaw Memorial United Church
Around the Bay Road Race 5 kilometre marker
Queen Mary Elementary School
Holy Family Roman Catholic Church
Holy Family Elementary School (right behind Holy Family R.C. Church)
Cannon Street ends and merges here with Britannia Avenue 
Andrew Warburton Park

Communities

Note: Listing of neighbourhoods from West to East. 
Strathcona
Central - The financial center of Hamilton, Ontario
Beasley
Landsdale
Gibson
Stipley
Crown Point West
Crown Point East
Homeside

Roads that are parallel with Cannon Street

Lower City Roads:
Burlington Street, West/East
Barton Street, West/East
Cannon Street, West/East
Wilson Street 
King William Street
King Street, West/East
Main Street, West/East; - Queenston Road
Jackson Street, East
Hunter Street, West/East 
Augusta Street
Charlton Avenue, West/East 
Aberdeen Avenue
Niagara Escarpment (Mountain) Roads:
Concession Street
Queensdale Avenue West/ East
Scenic Drive - Fennell Avenue, West/East
Sanatorium Road
Mohawk Road, West/East
Limeridge Road West/East
Lincoln M. Alexander Parkway - Mud Street, (Hamilton City Road 11)
Stone Church Road, West/East
; Rymal Road, West/East
Twenty Road

Roads that cross Cannon Street
Note: Listing of streets from West to East.
 Queen Street, North
 Hess Street, North
 Bay Street, North
 MacNab Street, North
 James Street, North
 Hughson Street, North
 John Street, North
 Catharine Street, North
 Ferguson Avenue, North
 Wellington Street, North
 Victoria Avenue, North
 Wentworth Street, North
 Sherman Avenue, North
 Gage Avenue, North
 Ottawa Street, North
 Kenilworth Avenue, North

References

MapArt Golden Horseshoe Atlas - Page 647/648 - Grids G11, G12, G13, G14, G15, G16, G17, G18

External links
Google Maps: Cannon Street (Hybrid)

Roads in Hamilton, Ontario